Pleurobranchus forskalii is a species of side-gill sea slug, a notaspidean, a marine gastropod mollusk in the family Pleurobranchidae.

The specific name was coined in honor of Peter Forsskål.

Distribution 
This species occurs in:

 European waters
 Mediterranean Sea
 Red Sea

References

External links 

 Jochum, A., & Favre, A. (2017). "First record of the sea slug Stylocheilus striatus (Quoy & Gaimard, 1825)(Anaspidea, Aplysiidae) and swarming behavior for Bazaruto Archipelago, Mozambique with the first record of Pleurobranchus forskalii Rüppel & Leuckart, 1828 (Nudipleura, Pleurobranchidae) for Bazaruto Island (Gastropoda, Heterobranchia)". Check List 13(5): 435-441. 
 

Pleurobranchidae
Gastropods described in 1828